Kim Min-Seok (born February 25, 1992) is a South Korean male table tennis player. He is a member of the South Korean national team and won several medals at international tournaments including the World Table Tennis Championships. He is currently ranked at number 89 in the world as of September 2016, with his all-time high being number 15 in April 2014.

References

External links
ITTF Database

1992 births
Living people
South Korean male table tennis players
Asian Games medalists in table tennis
Table tennis players at the 2010 Asian Games
Table tennis players at the 2014 Asian Games
Asian Games silver medalists for South Korea
Asian Games bronze medalists for South Korea
Medalists at the 2010 Asian Games
Medalists at the 2014 Asian Games
Universiade medalists in table tennis
World Table Tennis Championships medalists
Universiade gold medalists for South Korea
Universiade bronze medalists for South Korea
Medalists at the 2015 Summer Universiade
21st-century South Korean people